Mud cat may refer to:
Ameiurus, genus of fish
Pylodictis, genus of fish
Mississippi MudCats, a football team
Carolina Mudcats, a baseball team